The  Diocesan Training Centre  (formally  The Diocesan Training Centre for Ministries and Community Development of the Anglican Church in Mauritius ) is a Mauritian educational institution in Rose Hill, Mauritius established in 2004.

The Centre

It was established in 2004 as an amalgamation of St Paul's Theological College and the Bishop Ghislain Emmanuel Library. The centre offers both theological training for Anglican ordinands and also ecumenical theological education.

Directors

Brian Marajh, 2004–2008, subsequently Bishop of George in South Africa.
David Doveton
Colin Peattie
Oliver Simon, 2010–2012, subsequently Bishop of Antsiranana in Mauritius.
P. J. Lawrence, 2013–2016, previously Bishop of Nandyal in the Church of South India.
Dr Yesudoss Moses

References

Anglican seminaries and theological colleges
Education in Mauritius
2004 establishments in Mauritius